Alexander Banor Tettey (born 4 April 1986) is a Norwegian former professional footballer who played as a central midfielder.

Having established himself at Rosenborg, he played for French club Rennes and English side Norwich City. Born in Ghana, he played for the Norway national team from 2007 to 2016, earning 34 caps.

Early years
Tettey was born in Accra, Ghana, and moved to Bodø in Norway in 1999. He later moved to Trondheim, and started to play football for Kolstad. After joining Rosenborg's youth department, Tettey made his debut for the first team in a friendly match against GIF Sundsvall in January 2003, and in September 2003 he joined the first team squad and became the youngest player in Rosenborg's first team squad since Ola By Rise, Knut Torbjørn Eggen and Øivind Husby in 1977.

Club career

Rosenborg
Tettey started his career in Rosenborg as a central midfielder, but under Knut Tørum in 2007 he was made a defensive midfielder. In the 2008 season he was appointed Rosenborg's vice-captain and with club legend Roar Strand in and out of the team Tettey was a frequent captain.

Rennes
During his stay in Rosenborg, Tettey was being closely followed by French club Rennes, as they looked to create a squad with the potential of winning the title. On 31 July 2009, he signed a four-year contract with the French club. Tettey got his debut for the club shortly thereafter, but got injured in his first match for the club . His stay in Rennes has thereafter been plagued with injuries, but Tettey has nonetheless managed to pick up 60 appearances for the club. On 9 January 2011, Tettey scored his first goal in the Round of 64 of the French Cup. He scored the first of Rennes' goals as well the fifth in their 7–0 win over Cannes.

Norwich City
On 25 August 2012, Tettey signed for Premier League club Norwich City on a two-year deal for an undisclosed fee. He scored on his debut, scoring the only goal of the game in a 1–0 win against Doncaster Rovers on 26 September in the League Cup. He was also named man of the match, and stated he hoped his performance had been enough to earn him a start in a Premier League game. He made his league debut three days later, replacing Steve Morison in the 79th minute of a 5–2 defeat against Liverpool at Carrow Road. He made his first league start on 6 October against European champions Chelsea, however he could not prevent Norwich falling to a 4–1 defeat after Grant Holt had given the Canaries an 11th-minute lead. He made his full home debut on 20 October, helping Norwich to a shock 1–0 win against Arsenal after another goal from Holt. He became a regular in the team until he suffered an injury in February 2013, which persisted and kept him out of action for a longer period than initially thought. After over a month out, he made his return to playing on 30 March, replacing Jonny Howson in the 85th minute of a 1–0 defeat away to relegation rivals Wigan Athletic. He played in the final game of the season on 19 May, as Norwich produced a shock result to beat Manchester City 3–2 at the City of Manchester Stadium, to inflict only their second home defeat in the last 48 games, and to give Norwich their highest Premier League finish of 11th since they finished third in the 1992–93 season.

On 1 November 2013 it was announced that Tettey would be ruled out for 'a couple of months' following ankle surgery, which was performed after a stoppage-time collision with Cardiff City player Fraizer Campbell had left the ankle "very sore". On 22 March 2014 he scored his first league goal for Norwich with a 30-yard volley against Sunderland in a 2–0 win. It was described as one of the goals of the season. In December 2018 Tettey made his 200th appearance for Norwich City. In the final game of the 2019–20 season Tettey made his 100th Premier League appearance in a 5–0 defeat to Manchester City at the Etihad Stadium.

On 4 May 2021, Norwich announced Tettey would leave the club at the end of the 2020–21 season. During his time at the club, Tettey made 263 appearances in all competitions for the club, scoring eight times. In his last season at the club, Tettey helped mentor and coach BADU Sports, a London-based organisation for children and young adults.

Return to Rosenborg
After leaving Norwich, Tettey signed for his former club Rosenborg and was handed the number 6 jersey, a jersey not worn since Rosenborg legend Roar Strand retired in 2010.

International career
Tettey is a naturalized Norwegian and has been capped for the Norwegian under-18, under-19 and under-21 youth teams, as well as the senior team. Tettey made his debut for Norway on 22 August 2007, playing in a 2–1 friendly win against Argentina. Over the course of a nine-year international career, Tettey made 34 caps for Norway, scoring three times.

Career statistics

Club

International
Scores and results list Norway's goal tally first, score column indicates score after each Tettey goal.

Honours
Rosenborg
Eliteserien: 2006, 2009

Norwich City
EFL Championship: 2018–19 2020–21
Football League Championship play-offs: 2015

References

External links

Alexander Tettey's profile, stats & pics
Player profile, rosenborg.info. Retrieved 4 July 2008.

1986 births
Living people
Footballers from Accra
Sportspeople from Bodø
Naturalised citizens of Norway
Norwegian people of Ghanaian descent
Norwegian footballers
Ghanaian footballers
Norway youth international footballers
Norway under-21 international footballers
Norway international footballers
Rosenborg BK players
Skeid Fotball players
Stade Rennais F.C. players
Norwich City F.C. players
Eliteserien players
Ligue 1 players
Premier League players
English Football League players
Norwegian expatriate footballers
Expatriate footballers in France
Expatriate footballers in England
Norwegian expatriate sportspeople in France
Norwegian expatriate sportspeople in England
Association football midfielders
Association football coaches